This is a list of Hit the Stage episodes.
 - Contestant with highest scores
 - Contestant with lowest scores

Season 1

Episodes 1–2, Theme: Devils
Contestants : Hyoyeon (Girls' Generation), Taemin (SHINee), Bora (Sistar), Hoya (Infinite), U-Kwon (Block B), Shownu (Monsta X), Momo (Twice), Ten (NCT)

Results by Order of Performance

*As stated in episode 2, Ten had the highest score with 6 votes, the other contestants received 5 votes or less from the judges.

Episodes 3–4, Theme: This Love
Contestants : Hyoyeon (Girls' Generation), Jang Hyunseung, Hoya (Infinite), U-Kwon (Block B), Feeldog (Big Star), Momo (Twice), Ten (NCT), Chungha (I.O.I)

Results by Order of Performance

Episodes 5–6, Theme: Uniform
Contestants : Stephanie, Hyoyeon (Girls' Generation), Jang Hyunseung, Bora (Sistar), Feeldog (Big Star), Shownu (Monsta X), Rocky (Astro), Ten (NCT)

Results by Order of Performance

Episodes 7–8, Theme: Crazy
Contestants : Nicole, Jang Hyunseung, Bora (Sistar), U-Kwon (Block B), Seyong (Myname), Feeldog (Big Star), Mijoo (Lovelyz), Shownu (Monsta X)

Results by Order of Performance

Episode 9, Theme: The Fight
Contestants : Hyoyeon (Girls' Generation), Min (miss A), Changjo (Teen Top), Yugyeom (Got7), Bitto (UP10TION), Eunjin (DIA) & Chaeyeon (DIA & I.O.I), Ten (NCT)

Results by Order of Performance

Episode 10, Theme: Final
Contestants : Hyoyeon (Girls' Generation), U-Kwon (Block B), Yugyeom (Got7), Shownu (Monsta X), Ten (NCT), Chungha (I.O.I)

Results by Order of Performance

Lists of South Korean television series episodes